Olkhovsky District is an administrative [district (raion), one of the thirty-three in Volgograd Oblast, Russia. Municipally, it is incorporated as Olkhovsky Municipal District. It is located in the center of the oblast. Its administrative center is the rural locality (a selo) of Olkhovka. Population:  19,178 (2002 Census);  The population of Olkhovka accounts for 30.6% of the district's total population.

References

Notes

Sources

Districts of Volgograd Oblast